Victor Estima is a fourth degree Carlos Gracie, Jr. black belt who, along with his brother Braulio Estima, was coached under Ze Radiola in his native Brazil. He has competed and won at the highest level in Brazilian Jiu-Jitsu at European, Pan-American and World Championships.

Gracie Barra Braço de Prata 
Victor is based at the Gracie Barra Braço de Prata Brazilian Jiu Jitsu Academy in Lisbon Portugal. He was formally based at the Gracie Barra Nottingham Jiu Jitsu Academy in Nottingham England from 2011 until July 2021.

Tournament results 
  4 x State Champion
 2002 World Mundials Absolute division (blue belt) – bronze medal
 2003 World Mundials (adult division – blue belt) – silver medal
 2005 World Mundials (adult division – purple belt) – silver medal
 2006 Panams (brown belt adult middle) – silver medal
 2008 European Championships (black belt adult middle) – bronze medal
 2008 European Championships (absolute black belt) – bronze medal
 2008 World Mundials (black belt adult middle) - bronze medal
 2009 World Pro (black belt adult -85kg) - silver medal
 2010 World Mundials No Gi (black belt adult middle) - bronze medal
 2011 European Championships (black belt adult middle) – bronze medal
 2011 World Mundials No Gi (black belt adult middle) - gold medal
 2012 European Championships (black belt adult middle) – gold medal
 2012 Panams (black belt adult middle) - silver medal
 2012 British Open (black belt adult middle) - gold medal
 2012 World Mundials (black belt adult middle) - bronze medal
 2013 IBJJF Pro League (black belt adult middle) - gold medal
 2013 British Open (black belt adult middle) - gold medal
 2013 British Open (absolute black belt) - gold medal
 2013 World Pro (black belt adult -85kg) - silver medal
 2013 World Mundials (black belt adult middle) - bronze medal
 2014 World Pro (black belt adult -85kg) - silver medal
 2014 World Mundials (black belt adult middle) - bronze medal
 2015 World Pro (black belt adult -85kg) - silver medal
 2015 World Mundials (black belt adult middle) - bronze medal
 2016 IBJJF British Nationals (black belt adult middle) - gold medal
 2016 IBJJF British Nationals (absolute black belt) - gold medal
 2022 Compnet UK National Championship (black belt master middle) - gold medal
 2022 Compnet UK National Championship (black belt master absolute) - gold medal

References

 Results can be verified at the  Confederation of Brazilian Jiu-Jitsu Results website.

Brazilian practitioners of Brazilian jiu-jitsu
Living people
Year of birth missing (living people)
World No-Gi Brazilian Jiu-Jitsu Championship medalists